Madhu Kambikar is an Indian performing folk art artist, theatre actor and film and TV personality, from Maharashtra.

Personal life 
She was born in Malegaon, a village in Beed district, 28 July 1953 in the Kolhati community. She dropped out of school and used to follow her father himself a performing artist to shows. She herself became a performer at a very young age. She is the aunt of the late Kishor Shantabai Kale.

On 27 November 2016, she fell unconscious on stage during a lavani-tamasha performance at Yashwant Natya Mandir, Matunga and was hospitalised.

Folk and contemporary theatre 
She acted in about a dozen folk plays, including:
 Dadu Indurikar's ""
 Shankar Patil's ""
 Ashok Paranjape's ""
 Vasant Sabnis' ""
 Atmaram Sawant's ""
 Ashok Patole/ Suyog's ""
 Her own "" directed by Upendra Limaye
She has acted in 22–25 contemporary plays, amongst them are:
 
 
 
 Paying guest

Selected filmography 
She has acted in over a hundred films, amongst them are:
 Shapit
 Mukta
 Shola Aur Shabnam (1992 film) Hindi film
 Doghi
 
 
 Ek hota vidushak
 Zapatlela
 Zapatlela 2
 Debu
 
 
 
 Laxmi
 
 
 Rikshavali
 
 Raosaheb
 Mumbaicha dabewala
 Balagandharva

Accolades 
 Hansa Wadkar Special Award for Best Actress
 Natvarya Keshavrao Date Puraskar
 Chairperson of the 2013 Mahila Lokakala Sammelan, Nagpur
 Lokashahir Patthe Bapurao Puraskar
 Maharshi Shankarrao Mohite-Patil Lavani Kalavant Puraskar 2007
 Zee Chitra Gaurav Life Time Achievement Award 2018

References 

Living people
Indian musical theatre actresses
Indian folk singers
Singers from Maharashtra
Women musicians from Maharashtra
20th-century Indian singers
20th-century Indian women singers
1953 births